Pinguicula toldensis is an insectivorous plant of the genus Pinguicula endemic to the Nipe-Sagua-Baracoa mountain region of eastern Cuba.

References

Carnivorous plants of North America
toldensis
Endemic flora of Cuba
Plants described in 2007